"Erotic City ("make love not war Erotic City come alive")" is a song by the musician Prince. It was released as the B-side to the 1984 single "Let's Go Crazy" and the 12" version of the 1986 single "Girls & Boys". The dance mix of "Erotic City" was released as a 3" and 5" CD single in Germany in 1989 and 1990 respectively. The artwork for the single features the same image of Prince that was used for the cover of "I Would Die 4 U". The extended version of the latter was included as the B-side of "Erotic City".
The song was released in two versions. The extended remix was released as the B-side to Let's Go Crazy, while the edit (pitched nearly a key higher) made it to "The Hits/The B-sides".*

"Erotic City" was re-released on CD on The Hits/The B-Sides in 1993 and the Girl 6 soundtrack in 1996. The song can be heard in the Spike Lee film Girl 6.

While delivering his speech prior to the induction of the Funk collective known as Parliament-Funkadelic into the Rock and Roll Hall of Fame in May 1997, Prince explained that "Erotic City" was recorded directly after seeing Parliament-Funkadelic at the Beverly Theatre in Los Angeles in 1983.

The song starts with a guitar string plucked and whammied, before dropping into the drum track (which sounds as if he may have reversed on the 4/8 like a computer). The experimental number relies on a strong bass line and a simple keyboard riff. The song features Prince's voice both sped up and slowed down at various times to sound like different singers. Also featured is Sheila E., in her recording debut (with Prince), who became a close associate with Prince and worked with him extensively over the years. Even though the song was a B-side to a #1 hit, it received significant radio play.

The song was notable for its sexual references, and the use of the word fuck ("we can fuck until the dawn"), although some people, especially Sheila E. (who sings the chorus), have claimed the word is actually funk, allowing it to be played on the radio in the late 1980s into the 1990s. However, since 2004, the radio version is edited to repeat part A of the hook and omit the potential obscenity misheard in part B because the Federal Communications Commission has levied fines against stations that played the song for broadcasting allegedly indecent material, including KLUC-FM in Las Vegas, Nevada; KTFM in San Antonio, Texas; and KBZR (now KZON) in Phoenix, Arizona.

Track listing

CD maxi-single: Paisley Park/Warner Bros. Records 21185 (Germany)
 1. "Erotic City" (Dance Mix) – 7:24
 2. "I Would Die 4 U" (extended version) – 10:15
* also available as a 3" Mini CD

References

1984 songs
1989 singles
1990 singles
Prince (musician) songs
Songs written by Prince (musician)
American dance-pop songs
Warner Records singles
Paisley Park Records singles
Song recordings produced by Prince (musician)